Albert Aguilà i Lalana (born 9 August 1970) is a Spanish football manager and former player who played mainly as a forward.

Playing career
Born in Almacelles, Lleida, Catalonia, Aguilà joined Real Madrid's La Fábrica at the age of 14. On 13 January 1988, before even having appeared with the reserves, he made his first team debut by coming on as a late substitute for Paco Llorente in a 3–2 Copa del Rey away loss against CE Sabadell FC.

Aguilà made his La Liga debut on 18 June 1989, replacing Bernd Schuster in a 3–1 away win over Elche CF. In June 1990, after establishing himself as a regular for Castilla, he was loaned to CD Logroñés in the top tier.

In 1991, Aguilà signed a permanent deal with CA Osasuna, also in the first division. After scoring a career-best seven goals during the 1992–93 campaign, he moved to UE Lleida in the same category, suffering relegation in his first season and subsequently struggling with injuries.

In January 1997, after more than a year without playing, Aguilà signed for CF Gavà in Segunda División B. He moved to Tercera División side UD Barbastro in the summer, before returning to the third tier with CD Calahorra in 1998.

In 2000, Aguilà returned to the city of Logroño after agreeing to a contract with CD Recreación de La Rioja. He retired in the following year at the age of just 31, after helping the side in their promotion to the fourth tier.

Coaching career
After retiring, Aguilà worked as a youth coach at Comillas CF and former side Osasuna before being appointed manager of SD Logroñés in the fourth tier on 13 February 2019. He departed the side in May 2021, after achieving two consecutive promotions (to Segunda División B in 2020 and to the newly-created third tier named Primera División RFEF in 2021).

On 27 December 2021, Aguilà took over UD Logroñés' reserves in Segunda División RFEF. The following 3 April, he replaced Mere at the helm of the main squad.

Managerial statistics

References

External links

1970 births
Living people
People from Segrià
Sportspeople from the Province of Lleida
Spanish footballers
Footballers from Catalonia
Association football forwards
La Liga players
Segunda División players
Segunda División B players
Tercera División players
Real Madrid Castilla footballers
Real Madrid CF players
CA Osasuna players
UE Lleida players
CF Gavà players
UD Barbastro players
CD Calahorra players
Spanish football managers
Primera Federación managers
Segunda División B managers
Segunda Federación managers
Tercera División managers
UD Logroñés managers